Juan Domingo Patricio Cabrera (18 June 1952 — 3 September 2007) was an Argentine professional footballer who played as a midfielder.

On 20 October 1976, while playing for Talleres de Córdoba against Argentinos Juniors in the Argentine Primera División, Cabrera faced 15 year old Diego Maradona who was making his professional debut. A few minutes into the game, Maradona kicked the ball through Cabrera’s legs. Thirty years later, Cabrera remembered: "I was on the right side of the field and went to press him, but he didn't give me a chance. He made the nutmeg and when I turned around, he was far away from me".

References

Argentine footballers
Argentine Primera División players